Semiramide riconosciuta (Semiramis Recognized) is an Italian opera with serious action, or dramma per musica, by Nicola Porpora, set to a libretto by Metastasio with some textual changes, possibly by Domenico Lalli. The opera was written for some of the finest contemporary singers, and includes a technically demanding series of da capo arias.

Performance history
The opera was first performed on 26 December 1729 at the Teatro San Giovanni Grisostomo in Venice. Metastasio's libretto had been used in Rome, on 6 February that same year, for another setting of the same title by Leonardo Vinci.

Roles

Synopsis
The Egyptian princess Semiramide rules Assyria disguised as a man. Princess Tamiri prepares to choose a husband from three candidates, setting in motion a series of events that lead to Semiramide being reunited with her lover Scitalce, and the exposure of the villainy of his rival Sibari.

Revivals and recordings
 Semiramide riconosciuta: Stefano Montanari at Le Festival International d’Opéra Baroque de Beaune
 Excerpts Carnevale 1729 Ann Hallenberg Montanari, Il pomo d'Oro Pentatone

References

External links

Libretto for Vinci's opera, from Libretti d'Opera.it, accessed 13 July 2011
Full score of Semiramide riconosciuta, accessed 30 December 2012, 256 pages, Urtext-Edition by Holger Schmitt-Hallenberg, Gran Tonante
Robinson, Michael F. (1992): "Semiramide riconosciuta" in The New Grove Dictionary of Opera, ed. Stanley Sadie (London) 

Italian-language operas
Operas by Nicola Porpora
1729 operas
Operas set in ancient Egypt
Operas